Arhopaloscelis bifasciatus is a species of beetle in the family Cerambycidae. It was described by Kraatz in 1879. It is known from China, Japan, Russia, and Siberia.

References

Desmiphorini
Beetles described in 1879